The 1996 Trans America Athletic Conference men's basketball tournament (now known as the ASUN men's basketball tournament) was held February 29–March 2 at the Edmunds Center at Stetson University in DeLand, Florida.

 defeated  in the championship game, 86–77, to win their second TAAC/Atlantic Sun men's basketball tournament.

The Golden Knights, therefore, received the TAAC's automatic bid to the 1996 NCAA tournament, where they lost to UMass in the first round.

Format
Prior to the season, the TAAC added one more team, Jacksonville State, to reach a total of 12 teams. For conference scheduling, these teams were separated into two six-team divisions. However, only the top eight teams in the standings, regardless of conference, were invited to participate in the tournament.

College of Charleston, despite finishing at the top of the conference standings, were not able to participate as a transitioning Division I member.

Bracket

References

ASUN men's basketball tournament
Tournament
TAAC men's basketball tournament
TAAC men's basketball tournament
TAAC men's basketball tournament